Albumin tannate (also known as Tannin albuminate) is an antidiarrheal.

Antidiarrhoeals
Tannins